Drishyomaan Moheener Ghoraguli (Unstoppable Moheener Ghoraguli) is the third and the second single album by the Bengali rock band Moheener Ghoraguli. It was released in 1979 as a Standard Play 45-rpm disc by Bharati Records, and includes two singles like their previous album.

Track listing

Personnel
 Gautam Chattopadhyay–- Guest artist

Technical
 Engineer–- Sushanta Bandyopadhyaya
 Cover–- Sangeeta Ghoshal (uncredited)

External links

1979 albums
Moheener Ghoraguli albums
Bengali-language albums
Single albums